Garfield Sieber Pancoast (June 16, 1914 – March 18, 1992) was a Republican member of the Pennsylvania House of Representatives.

References

External links-
G. Sieber Pancoast's obituary

Republican Party members of the Pennsylvania House of Representatives
1914 births
1992 deaths
20th-century American politicians